{{DISPLAYTITLE:C23H21FN2O}}
The molecular formula C23H21FN2O (molar mass: 360.42 g/mol, exact mass: 360.1638 u) may refer to:

 FUBIMINA (also known as BIM-2201, BZ-2201 and FTHJ)
 THJ-2201

Molecular formulas